Villanueva del Ariscal is a town located in the Province of Seville, Spain. It has a population of 6,571 inhabitants (2018 INE). It is located between Olivares (to the north) and Espartinas (to the south). It also borders Sanlúcar la Mayor to the west.

Gallery

References

External links
Villanueva del Ariscal - Sistema de Información Multiterritorial de Andalucía

Municipalities of the Province of Seville